Todd Reid (3 June 1984 – 23 October 2018) was an Australian professional tennis player. He excelled as a junior and peaked in the Men's Tour in September 2004, reaching a career-high singles ranking of world No. 105.

Tennis career

Juniors
As a junior tennis player, Reid reached several finals on the Australian Junior calendar and in 2002, he won the Wimbledon Boys' Singles title, defeating the likes of Steve Darcis and Frank Dancevic on his way to victory. His victory led him to being named 2002 Australian Institute of Sport Junior Athlete of the Year.

Reid compiled a win–loss record of 87–43 in singles (97–40 in doubles) and reached as high as No. 2 in the junior singles world rankings in 2002 (and No. 4 in doubles).

Pro tour

Reid began playing Futures tournaments in 2001 and won his first Futures tournament in 2002 in New Zealand. He began playing Challenger tournaments after his maiden Futures victory, with his ranking reaching new heights he made the cut for the qualifying tournament in Nottingham and played his first ATP match against Greg Rusedski after qualifying. Reid's 2004 Australian summer was the biggest highlight of his professional career where he reached the final of a challenger in New Caledonia (losing to Guillermo Cañas in the final), made the quarterfinal in Adelaide and Sydney and made the third round of the Australian Open, where he lost to second seed and eventual champion Roger Federer in straight sets, winning just four games. He had beaten Sargis Sargsian in five sets in his preceding second round match on the Melbourne Arena, during which he struggled with a foot injury, cramping and vomiting.

In May 2005, Reid, due to injuries, quit the tennis tour as a full-time participant. He did play two Futures events in Victoria, Australia in early 2006, but did not advance beyond the second round.  He played no events in 2007.  The following year Reid played one Futures event in April in Spain and reached the final. He then played one event in Australia in September, losing in the first round, and another in December, losing through retirement in the semi-finals. In the spring of 2009, Reid played three events, retiring from matches due to injury in each event.

Reid's career-high doubles ranking was World No. 305, which he achieved in February 2003. He won $301,844 during his career.

Death
Reid was found dead on 23 October 2018 at the age of 34. A cause of death has not been announced.

ATP Challenger and ITF Futures finals

Singles: 10 (6–4)

Doubles: 2 (0–2)

Performance timeline

Singles

Junior Grand Slam finals

Singles: 2 (1 title, 1 runner-up)

Doubles: 2 (1 title, 1 runner-up)

References

External links
 
 
 
  (archive)

1984 births
2018 deaths
Australian male tennis players
Australian Open (tennis) junior champions
Hopman Cup competitors
Tennis players from Melbourne
Tennis players from Sydney
Wimbledon junior champions
Grand Slam (tennis) champions in boys' singles
Grand Slam (tennis) champions in boys' doubles